Betzdorf is a town and municipality in northern Rhineland-Palatinate, Germany.
Betzdorf is part of the district of Altenkirchen. Betzdorf is located on the river Sieg, approx.  south-west of Siegen. Betzdorf is the seat of the Verbandsgemeinde Betzdorf-Gebhardshain.

It is twinned with the town of Ross-on-Wye, England.

References

Altenkirchen (district)